District 12 may also refer to a fictional location in The Hunger Games universe, or to other 12th legislative districts.

District 12 is an urban district (quận) of Ho Chi Minh City, the largest and most populous city in Vietnam.

As of 2010, the district had a population of 427,083. The district covers an area of 53.0 km². The district is divided into 11 small subsets which are called wards.

District 12 borders Bình Dương Province and the city of Thủ Đức to the east, Hóc Môn District to the west and north, the districts of Bình Thạnh, Gò Vấp, Tân Bình and Tân Phú to the south.

Administration 
The district consists of 10 wards:
An Phú Đông
Đông Hưng Thuận
Hiệp Thành
Tân Chánh Hiệp
Tân Thới Hiệp
Tân Thới Nhất
Thạnh Lộc
Thạnh Xuân
Thới An
Trung Mỹ Tây

Quang Trung Software City 
The goal of the city is to offer a living and workplace to people who are particularly interested in software development as an economic incentive system to spur the growth of the software industry in Vietnam.  It is sponsored by the Japan External Trade Organization and United States Agency for International Development.

The Vietnamese government has arranged for high speed internet to be wired to the area. The city opened in 2001 and housed 20,000 people in 2010.

Legal Incentives 
In order to facilitate use of this resource a number of laws have been set up.

Taxes 
Companies are tax-exempt for their first four years after making a profit, and then only charged 50% of their normal taxes for the next nine years after their exemption. Overall taxes for the area are 10% for the first 15 years of the city, and 25% after that.  Imported materials used for software production are import-tax free so long as they can not yet be used domestically.  Exported software products are export-tax exempt.  A Value Added Tax is also waived for exported software and domestically consumed software.

Foreign Workers 
Special privileges are available to foreigners who are involved in a city project, particularly in getting visas and in buying or renting houses.

Cloud Service Provider 
Another part of the government incentives includes a cloud computing platform for use by local companies.

References

Districts of Ho Chi Minh City